Ghorbanali Saadat Qarabagh (born in Qarah Bagh, Urmia in West Azerbaijan province) is an Iranian reformist politician, and the governor of West Azerbaijan from 2013 to 2017, in the Government of Hassan Rouhani. He had fifteen years prior administrative experience in county government in the provinces of West Azerbaijan, Qum and Lorestan, from 1990 to 2005.

References

People from Urmia
Living people
Governors of West Azerbaijan Province
Governors of Lorestan Province
Governors of Qom Province
1956 births